Haygarth is a surname. Notable people with the name include:
 Arthur Haygarth (1825–1903), English cricketer and cricket historian
 Brent Haygarth (born 1967), South African tennis player
 Edward Haygarth (1854–1903), English cricketer and soccer player
 John Haygarth (1740–1827), British physician
 Michael Haygarth (1934–2016), English chess master
 Tony Haygarth (1945–2017), British television, film and theatre actor